Larry Shaw may refer to:

Larry Shaw (politician), American politician
Larry Shaw (director), American film and television director
Larry Shaw (editor) (1924–1985), American writer
Larry Shaw (physicist) (1939–2017), American physicist and founder of Pi Day
 Larry Shaw, physicist and inventor of Astrojax